Aleksandr Ivanovich Yatsimirsky (1873 — 1925, Leningrad) was a Russian philologist-slavistic and a specialist in history of Romania and Moldavia. He was one of the authors of the Brockhaus and Efron Encyclopedic Dictionary.

Biography 
Alexander Yatsimirsky was born in 1873. He graduated from Imperial Moscow University. For his study "Gregory Tsamblak" (St. Petersburg, 1904, published by the Russian Academy of Sciences) Yatsimirsky received a doctorate in Slavic philology, and in 1905 he got a positive response to the Lomonosov Prize Committee.

In 1906—1913 Yatsimirsky was Privat-docent of the Slavonic Philology Department of St. Petersburg University. From 1913 to 1918 he was a Professor of the University of Warsaw (which was in 1915 evacuated to Rostov-on-Don), since 1918 he held the post of the Rector of the Don Archaeological Institute, and since 1922 he also was a Professor of Rostov University.

Among his main works are "The inventory of old Slavonic and Russian manuscripts in the collection of Pyotr Shchukin" (Moscow, 1896 and 1897); "From Slavic manuscripts. Texts and notes. I-V"(Moscow, 1898); "Slavonic and Russian Manuscripts in Romanian Libraries" (St. Petersburg, 1905, ed., Academy of Sciences); "From the history of Slavic manuscripts of the 15th-17th centuries in Moldavia and Wallachia"(St. Petersburg, 1906); "From the history of Slavic sermons in Moldavia" (St. Petersburg, 1906); "Small texts and notes about old Slavonic and Russian literature" (St. Petersburg, 1907).

Yatsimirsky also wrote a number of articles in the Brockhaus and Efron Encyclopedic Dictionary, mainly devoted to Polish literature. Some articles of Yatsimirsky were translated to Bulgarian, Serbian, Czech and Polish languages.

References 

1873 births
1925 deaths
Academic staff of Southern Federal University
Russian philologists
Imperial Moscow University alumni
Academic staff of Saint Petersburg State University
Academic staff of the University of Warsaw